Altec may refer to:

Altec Lansing, an American audio electronics company 
Aerospace Logistics Technology Engineering Company (ALTEC),  an Italian center for engineering and logistics services
Latin American Alliance for Civic Technology (ALTEC), founded in part by Omidyar Network